Ronald Jeffery Brace III (December 18, 1986 – April 23, 2016) was an American football nose tackle. He was drafted by the New England Patriots in the second round of the 2009 NFL Draft as a defensive end. He played college football at Boston College.

Early years
Brace attended Burncoat Senior High School in Worcester, Massachusetts. As a senior, Brace earned All-State and Worcester Telegram & Gazette all-star honors. He was also a three-time conference all-star choice and played in the 2004 Massachusetts Shriners Football Classic. He was the team captain and team MVP in 2003 and also excelled in track and field, winning the state shot put title in 2003 and 2004. Brace was rated as a 3-star recruit coming out of high school by both 247 Sports and Rivals. Brace received offers from Boston College, Connecticut, Hofstra, UMass, and Northeastern. He committed to Boston College in February 2004.

College career
After redshirting the 2004 season, Brace made his college debut for Boston College in the 2005 season opener at BYU. He finished the season with 11 tackles (six solos) and one tackle for loss in 12 games (one start). He had one solo tackle against Boise State in the MPC Computers Bowl.

Brace played and started in 11 games at defensive tackle in 2006. He had 20 tackles (11 unassisted) and registered 3.5 tackles for loss. He made a career-high five tackles (three solo), including one tackle-for-loss, and recovered one fumble in BC's Meineke Car Care Bowl victory versus Navy.

Brace finished the 2007 season with 27 total tackles (14 solos), 7.5 tackles for loss, and 2.5 sacks He registered three tackles (one solo) and 0.5 tackles for loss in the ACC Championship Game against Virginia Tech and two tackles in the 2007 Champs Sports Bowl against Michigan State. He was an All-ACC team honorable mention.

Brace began his 2008 senior season on the Outland Trophy and All-ACC team watch lists. He played in all 14 games in 2008, recording 27 tackles and three sacks while paired with defensive tackle B. J. Raji, a first round pick in the 2009 NFL Draft. After the season, he was named to the second-team All-ACC.

He was member of the Iota Phi Theta fraternity.

Professional career

Pre-draft

New England Patriots

2009 season
Brace was drafted by the Patriots in the second round (40th overall) of the 2009 NFL Draft. On July 17, 2009, he was signed to a 4-year contract with approximately $2.82 million in guaranteed money.

Brace was active for six of the first 13 games of the season, recording two tackles. Brace started his first NFL game on December 20, 2009 against the Buffalo Bills in place of an injured Vince Wilfork and Pryor at nose tackle. He started again for the Patriots in Week 16 and finished the season with eight tackles in nine games played (two starts). Brace was inactive for the Patriots' playoff loss against the Baltimore Ravens.

2010 season
Prior to the 2010, Brace was moved to defensive end, and missed most of training camp after failing his conditioning test. However, he returned and started the first three games of the regular season, including a four-tackle game in Week 2 against the New York Jets. Brace soon lost his starting job to rookie Brandon Deaderick, and was inactive for the team's Week 7 win over the San Diego Chargers.

Brace was active again in Week 8, and returned to the starting lineup two weeks later against the Pittsburgh Steelers. He was a reserve the next week against the Indianapolis Colts, but tied his season-high of four tackles in the game. Three weeks later, he started the Patriots' Week 13 game in Chicago, but sustained a concussion that kept him out of their Week 15 game against the Green Bay Packers. After playing in Week 16, Brace missed the team's regular season finale with an elbow injury.

Brace was placed on injured reserve on January 3, 2011, prior to the playoffs. He finished the regular season with 23 tackles in 13 games played (five starts).

2011 season
Brace started the season on the "PUP" list and returned to practice after week six.

2012 season
On December 29, 2012, Brace was released.

Washington Redskins
Brace signed with the Washington Redskins on February 14, 2013. He was released on August 31, 2013.

Death
Brace died of a heart condition on April 23, 2016, in Springfield, Massachusetts, at the age of 29.

References

External links
New England Patriots bio 
Boston College Eagles bio

1986 births
2016 deaths
Sportspeople from Springfield, Massachusetts
African-American players of American football
American football defensive ends
American football defensive tackles
Boston College Eagles football players
Players of American football from Worcester, Massachusetts
New England Patriots players
Washington Redskins players
20th-century African-American people
21st-century African-American sportspeople